Fight for You may refer to:

"Fight for You" (Jason Derulo song)
"Fight for You" (H.E.R. song)